The Yugoslav motorcycle Grand Prix was a motorcycling event forming part of the Grand Prix motorcycle racing season from 1969 to 1990.

Official names and sponsors
1969–1970: Velika nagrada Jadrana/Adriatic Grand Prix/Grand-Prix de l'Adriatique
1972–1974, 1977: Velika Nagrada Jugoslavije/Grand Prix de Yougoslavie (no official sponsor)
1975–1976, 1978–1980: Velika Nagrada Jugoslavije (no official sponsor)
1981, 1983–1989: Yu Grand Prix (no official sponsor)
1982: Yu Grand (no official sponsor)
1990: Yu Grand Prix/Velika Nagrada Jugoslavije (no official sponsor)

Winners of the Yugoslavian motorcycle Grand Prix

Multiple winners (riders)

Multiple winners (manufacturers)

By year

References

 

 
Recurring sporting events established in 1969
Recurring events disestablished in 1990
1969 establishments in Yugoslavia
1990 disestablishments in Yugoslavia